FINEX is the name for an iron making technology developed by former Siemens VAI (now Primetals Technologies) and POSCO. Molten iron is produced directly using iron ore fines and non-coking coal rather than traditional blast furnace methods through sintering and reduction with coke. Elimination of preliminary processing is claimed to make the plant for FINEX less expensive to build than a blast furnace facility of the same scale, additionally a 10-15% reduction in production costs is expected/claimed through cheaper raw materials, reduction of facility cost, pollutant exhaustion, maintenance staff and production time. The process is claimed to produce less pollutants such as SOx, NOx, and carbon dioxide than traditional methods.

This process is essentially a combination of FINMET's Fluidized Bed and COREX's Melter Gasifier, hence its name "FINEX".

See also
 Steel making
 HIsarna steelmaking process

External links
 Posco Commence Construction of New Steel Plant That Will Use FINEX Technology
 POSCO To Scrap 100-Year-Old Furnace Technology
 POSCO company website
 Primetals Technologies description

Steelmaking
Siemens